Prachi Misra Raghavendra (née Mishra; born 11 February 1988) is an Indian model. She was crowned Femina Miss India Earth 2012. She was also crowned Miss Congeniality during the sub-contests for Femina Miss India 2012.

Early and personal life
Prachi was born and brought up in Uttar Pradesh and lived in different cities of India. She completed her Bachelor of Technology in Computer Science from Hindustan College of Science and Technology, Mathura, Uttar Pradesh. She also completed her Post Graduate Diploma in Banking from Symbiosis Institute of Management Studies  Pune, Maharashtra.

Prachi started dating Mahat in 2017. The couple got engaged in April 2019 and married on February 1, 2020. Their son Adiyaman Raghavendra was born on 7 June 2021.

Femina Miss India
Mishra entered the Femina Miss India pageant and won the title Femina Miss India Earth. She was also crowned Miss Congeniality during the sub-contests for Femina Miss India 2012. Prachi Mishra also won the Radio Mirchi beauty queen award in Pune 2011.

Miss Earth 2012
Mishra represented India in Miss Earth 2012 that was held in Manila, Philippines.  She won a gold medal for Miss Friendship in Group 1 at Miss Earth 2012 and was crowned Miss Congeniality 2012.

References

Further reading
 The Times of India
 The Times of India
 The Times of India

External links

 
 Miss India - Official website

1988 births
Femina Miss India winners
Living people
Miss Earth 2012 contestants
People from Mirzapur
Female models from Uttar Pradesh
Miss Earth India delegates